August Hartel (26 February 1844 – 18 February 1890) was a German architect.

He died a few months after his appointment as Baumeister of the cathedral in Strasbourg.

References

External links 

 

1844 births
1890 deaths
Architects from Cologne
19th-century German architects